Vieux Fort (also known as Old Fort) is an unconstituted locality within the municipality of Bonne-Espérance in the Côte-Nord region of Quebec, Canada. It is also known as Old Fort Bay or Vieux-Fort (the latter is preferred by the Commission de toponymie du Québec).

Demographics 

Education
Commission scolaire du Littoral operates Mountain Ridge School (anglophone) in Old Fort.

References

Communities in Côte-Nord
Designated places in Quebec
Unconstituted localities in Quebec
Road-inaccessible communities of Quebec